A New Morning is the fifth studio album by English alternative rock band Suede, released in September 2002. By the time the album was released, public interest in the band had waned, as shown by the poor charting of both the album and singles. Despite this, however, the album received moderate praise from critics. It is the only Suede album not to be released in the US. It was the last studio album released by the band before their seven-year hiatus and reunion in 2010. Before recording took place, keyboardist and guitarist Neil Codling left the band due to his health concern, and later was replaced by former Strangelove guitarist, Alex Lee. As Codling returned to the band for their 2010 reunion, this is their only studio album to have featured Lee.

Background

The creation of Suede's fifth studio album A New Morning, was long and costly. Following the release of their 1999 album Head Music and subsequent tour, keyboardist Neil Codling announced his departure from the group on 23 March 2001, citing problems with Chronic fatigue syndrome. Singer Brett Anderson was furious at Codling's decision, but understood the reasons behind his departure: "He couldn't help it, I know, but I did feel aggrieved. I felt let down. But more at the universe than at Neil." Codling was replaced by former Strangelove keyboardist Alex Lee.

Anderson also had become sober for this record, overcoming his crack addiction and claiming that A New Morning was "the first ever Suede record that wasn't influenced in its making by drugs." Anderson wrote lyrics isolated in a country house in Surrey away from the rest of the band, where he immersed himself in music and literature. He read Atomised by Michel Houellebecq and books by Albert Camus, Leonard Cohen and Paul Auster. Anderson says, "I created a deliberate vacuum so all these influences would flood in. I spent a lot of time walking in the countryside, sometimes for hours and hours, fascinated by nature and its battle with concrete and steel. I was living in Concrete Island by J. G. Ballard."

Recording

The band began recording demos at Stanbridge Farm Studios in West Sussex in July 2000. In October the band took a break from writing to perform their only gig of the year, which took place in Reykjavík, Iceland, where they premiered nine new songs. The group originally began working with American producer Tony Hoffer in 2001, and anticipated having a single released by Autumn. Hoffer and Anderson had originally met in a toilet at Paisley Park in Minneapolis, Minnesota, where the two hit it off, finding several common musical interests. The meeting led to Anderson asking for Hoffer's input on some of the group's recent work.

In February 2001 the band took up residency at Rockfield Studios in Monmouth, Wales for a three-week trial run with Hoffer. The band were unimpressed with the trial run, especially Simon Gilbert and Richard Oakes, who both had strong opinions on the results. Nevertheless, the band decided to record the album with Hoffer and descended on Parkgate Studios, Hastings, in May with their new member Alex Lee, following Codling's departure. Although the group recorded ten songs with Hoffer that Anderson said were the "best we've written," most of the material recorded with him producing was scrapped. In September the group recorded two songs with ex The Stone Roses producer John Leckie. The versions of "Beautiful Loser" and "Positivity" were promising; however, Leckie had other commitments, forcing Suede to reconsider their options.

The group ultimately decided to work with Stephen Street, who was known for his collaborations with The Smiths and Blur. With Street, the band recorded most of the released material in two months. All the songs from the album were produced by Street, except "Positivity" which was produced by John Leckie, and "You Belong to Me" which was produced by Dave Eringa. Recording with Street began in January 2002, with the album finally being completed on 23 March 2002. Anderson had high praise for the producer, saying "Stephen has just turned this whole album around, he really has. Every song he's just taken and done something special with... From the millions of other sessions we've done for this album, there's just no comparison."

Overall, seven different recording studios and four producers were used during the two-year recording span for A New Morning, and costs estimated at around £1 million. Street stated that the album was a "return to classic song construction," and bassist Mat Osman said that lyrically A New Morning is "very positive and upbeat."

Release and promotion
Promotion for the album began on 4 May 2002 with a secret fan-club show. Suede played to one hundred fans at their London rehearsal studio the Depot. The secret gig coincided with the tenth anniversary release of debut single "The Drowners", which was marked by an earlier club night at the Liquid Rooms in King's  Cross. Fans were then transported to the rehearsals in two buses where the band performed fifteen songs, including eight new songs from the new album. The album was released 30 September 2002 and peaked at number 24, which is the lowest chart position of all the band's studio albums, and the only album not to chart in the top ten. The album remains the only studio album from Suede's catalogue not to be released in the US. The lead single for the album was "Positivity", which received a large amount of criticism from fans and the press. NME writer Julian Marshall wrote that "Positivity" was "[G]reeted with an apathetic shrug by everyone but the most devoted." Although it peaked at No. 16 on the charts and Anderson initially felt happy about the song, his feelings towards it would change in time. He later said of "Positivity" that "When I first wrote it I thought it was a masterpiece but soon realized that many people were genuinely offended by it." "Obsessions" was the second single released and despite being better received than "Positivity", the song charted at a lower position and was ultimately the final single released from the album. The album had first-week sales of 10,152 units, and went on to sell 21,943 units after 12 weeks.

Critical reception

Despite poor sales, the album satisfied press critics. At Metacritic, which assigns a normalised rating out of 100 to reviews from mainstream critics, A New Morning has an average score of 65 based on 8 reviews, indicating "generally favorable reviews." Stephen Thomas Erlewine of AllMusic felt that the album was a "solid, succinct collection of tuneful, stylish modern-day glam pop." He said it is not "a new beginning, nor does it take many risks, but it does find Suede in top form with good songs and an appealing record." Jason Fox of NME said that "A New Morning sees Suede show off their vulnerable side again. It won't attract any new admirers but old fans will love them more for it." The Guardians Steve Poole said that "'Beautiful Loser' and 'Astrogirl' gesture at past glories like 'Heroine' or 'The Chemistry Between Us', but lack that assured melodic grandiosity." He did have positive praise for the album saying: "there are moments of beauty, in 'Untitled' and the delicate miniature 'Morning'." Gareth Grundy of Q magazine was somewhat mixed, writing: "The faithful will be overjoyed: despite the optimistic title, there's nothing new here, only a distillation of trace elements from previous outings." Much of the album's songs and lyrics were criticised, with the exception of "Obsessions", which he called "the album's one true belter, riding squeling harmonica and oddly compelling lyrics." He summed up, saying the band "seem wholly uninterested in attracting passing trade. They might have always lived in their own world but it used to at least slightly resemble the one outside. Not any more." Andy Gill of The Independent felt the band had little new to offer, saying: "It may seem like A New Morning to the band, but others may find it more like Groundhog Day."

As the only Suede album not to be released in the US, there were no reviews from any US media. However, the album was widely covered by the Canadian music press, where it was met with a mixed reception. Rob Bolton of Exclaim! wrote: "Unfortunately, the songs seem a little lacklustre, and Brett Anderson's voice struggles, at times, showing the signs of age and abuse." However, he felt that it was better than Head Music and that "there are tracks like 'Obsessions' and 'One Hit To The Body' that recall what made Suede the trend-setting band that they were." Mike Bell of Jam! was harshly critical, writing: "Gone are most of the theatrics. Gone, too, is the powerful whine in Anderson's voice, and all that's left are quite silly faux clever lyrics and debatable melodies." Lorraine Carpenter of the Montreal Mirror felt that the record "is tainted by tired lyrical refrains and vocal melodies." Instead, she recommended readers listen to Suede's first three albums, while leaving A New Morning for "discount-bin destiny".

Aftermath
Suede released a compilation album Singles in 2003 which featured two new songs, "Love the Way You Love" and the single "Attitude". Shortly after the release of Singles the group issued a joint statement on 5 November explaining that outside of the remaining dates on their current tour, that Suede would not be working together for the foreseeable future: "Suede would like to announce that from next year (2004) they will be working on their own individual projects." The announcement confirmed rumours of the group splitting up since the release of A New Morning. Anderson later stated that he felt he had to break out of Suede as he was in an artistic dead end saying: "I need to do whatever it takes to get my demon back."

Track listing

2011 remastered and expanded version

13 & 14 were taken from the download of the alternative version of the album, Another Morning?, made available from the now-defunct website at the link included on the original CD.

PersonnelSuede Brett Anderson – vocals , percussion , acoustic guitar 
 Simon Gilbert – drums 
 Alex Lee – acoustic guitar , keyboards , harmonica , Wurlitzer , piano , Clavinet , organ , electric guitar , synthesiser , Rhodes , Mellotron , Prophet synthesiser , backing vocals 
 Richard Oakes – electric guitar , acoustic guitar , piano , Rhodes , Clavinet , backing vocals 
 Neil Codling – keyboards 
 Mat Osman – electric bass , Hammond organ Additional musicians Andrew Skeet - string arrangements
 Millennia Strings – strings
 Everton Nelson – violins 
 Gillon Cameron – violins 
 Roy Theaker – violins 
 Lucy Wilkins – violins 
 Stephen Hussery – violins 
 Richard George – violins 
 Frances Dewar – violins 
 Chris George – violins 
 Catherine Browning – violins 
 Chris Worsey – cellos 
 Ian Burdge – cellos 
 John Brandham – car horn Technical Stephen Street – production , post-production , mixing
 Tom Stanley – engineering 
 John Leckie – production 
 Dan Grech-Marguerat – engineering 
  Gordon Vicary – masteringArtwork'
 Blue Source – art direction
 Kate Gibb – screenprints
 Henrik Bulow – photography 
 Chris Lopez – photography

Charts

Bibliography

References

External links

A New Morning (deluxe reissue) at YouTube (streamed copy where licensed)
 

New Morning, A
New Morning, A
Albums produced by Stephen Street
Albums produced by John Leckie
Albums produced by Dave Eringa
Epic Records albums